The Maitland Estate is a historic home located at 9 Sunset Drive. in Cherry Hills Village, Colorado. Designed by Denver architects Merrill H. Hoyt & Burnham F. Hoyt and built in 1925 in a Tudor Revival style. The estate was the home of Denver business leader James Maitland who operated the Colorado Builders’ Supply.

The listing included a  area.

Through its first of two stories it is built of  brown brick laid in common bond.

See also
National Register of Historic Places listings in Arapahoe County, Colorado

References

External links 
 History of Colorado

Tudor Revival architecture in Colorado
Houses in Arapahoe County, Colorado
Houses on the National Register of Historic Places in Colorado
Historic districts on the National Register of Historic Places in Colorado
National Register of Historic Places in Arapahoe County, Colorado